Night of Henna (2005) is a comedy film directed by Hassan Zee (Bicycle Bride), and is the first Pakistani-American feature film. The film stars Pooja Kumar, Reef Karim, Nancy Carlin, Suhail Tayyeb, Ponni Swaminathan Chesser, and Craig Marker.

Plot
A young Pakistani woman is forced to choose between an arranged marriage set up by her family and her true love.

References

External links
 
 
 
 
 Night of Henna at Metacritic
 
 A. O. Scott, "A Collision of Cultures", April 22, 2005 review of Night of Henna at New York Times

2005 films
American comedy films
Pakistani comedy films
Films about Pakistani Americans
2005 comedy films
2000s American films